"Boy" is a song by US singer Marcella Detroit, released in December 1996 as the third single from her album Feeler. Although the most successful of all four singles released from Feeler, the song performed poorly nonetheless, peaking at #102 on the UK Singles Chart.

Track listing 
CD Single
"Boy" — 3:15
"Without Medication" — 4:14
"Sunday" — 3:54

Charts

References 

1996 singles
Marcella Detroit songs
Songs written by Marcella Detroit
Mega Records singles
Songs written by Michael Moran (music producer)
1996 songs